Balgarovo is a small town in southeastern Bulgaria. It is located in Burgas Municipality and is close to the town of Kameno.

Demography
The town of Balgarovo has 1,528 inhabitants as of December 2018. Nearly all inhabitants are ethnic Bulgarians (97%).

Gallery

References

Towns in Bulgaria
Populated places in Burgas Province